Suidobashi may refer to:
Suidōbashi Station 
Suidobashi Heavy Industry